The 1988 All-Ireland Senior Club Hurling Championship final was a hurling match played at Croke Park on 17 March 1988 to determine the winners of the 1987–88 All-Ireland Senior Club Hurling Championship, the 18th season of the All-Ireland Senior Club Hurling Championship, a tournament organised by the Gaelic Athletic Association for the champion clubs of the four provinces of Ireland. The final was contested by Midleton of Cork and Athenry of Galway, with Midleton winning by 3-8 to 0-9.

In the first and only championship meeting between the two sides, Athenry gave as good as they got for long periods of the first half. In a clever tactical move Midleton's Kevin Hennessy was given a roving brief along with Colm O'Neill and this gave the Cork star the space to strike for goals in 12th and 14th minutes. In spite of being stung for two goals, his marker, Dermot Monaghan, could not be faulted for either goals, and was viewed as Athenry's man-of-the-match. Despite the goals Athenry began to reassert themselves thanks to the hard grafting of Pat Higgins around midfield and P. J. Molloy's accuracy up front. He sent over five of his side's six first half points as Mideleton led at the break by 2-5 to 0-6.

Athenry restarted in determined fashion and hardworking midfielder John Hardiman first timed a ground shot over the bar for one of the best scores of the game. After Pat Higgins added another it was still anybody's game but two good saves by 'keeper Ger Power from Pat Higgins and Mixie Donoghue were opportunities that Athenry could not afford to miss. The failure to deliver quality ball to their forwards was proving costly for Athenry but they were still in the game by the 48th minute and trailed by  2-6 to 0-8. Around that time P. J. Molloy had two 21-yard frees saved by the outstanding Power and that seemed to knock the heart out of the Galway side.

Midleton's victory secured their first and only All-Ireland title. They become the 12th club to win the All-Ireland title, while they are the fourth Cork representatives to claim the ultimate prize.

Match

Details

External links
 Midleton Vs Athenry All-Ireland Club Final 1988 (Full Match)

References

1988 in hurling
All-Ireland Senior Club Hurling Championship Finals
Wexford GAA matches
Clare GAA matches